SWA may refer to:
 Eswatini (Swaziland), UNDP-Code
 SWA (band), started by Chuck Dukowski
 SWA (magazine), an Indonesian business magazine
 SWA, IATA airport code for:
 Shantou Waisha Airport, until 15 December 2011
 Jieyang Chaoshan International Airport, from 15 December 2011
 Scotch Whisky Association
 SOAP with Attachments, file transfer for web services
 Society of Women Artists
 South West Africa
 Southwest Airlines, ICAO code
 Stardom World Association
 Steel Wire Armoured (SWA) Cable
 Swansea railway station code
 ISO 639-2 and ISO 639-3 code for the Swahili language
 Swatantra Party, a political party of India
 St. Williams Association, a charity based in Thorpe St Andrew, England